Gadarn is a surname. Notable people with the surname include:

Hawys Gadarn
Hu Gadarn
Derfel Gadarn
Thomas Gadarn, MP